Jizerní Vtelno is a municipality and village in Mladá Boleslav District in the Central Bohemian Region of the Czech Republic. It has about 300 inhabitants.

Geography
It lies in the Jizera Table. The municipality is situated on the right bank of the Jizera River, which forms the eastern municipal border.

History
The first written mention of Jizerní Vtelno is from 1229. It belonged to the Stránov estate that was controlled from the castle adjacent to the village. Among the most notable owners of the estate were the Berka of Dubá family, the Bieberstein family, and the Slavata of Chlum family, who had the local castle rebuilt in the first half of the 17th century.

Sights
Jizerní Vtelno is known for the Stránov castle. A wooden fortress is Jizerní Vtelno was first documented in 1429. In 1463–1468, it was replaced by a Gothic castle, which was later rebuilt into a Renaissance residence. In 1890–1894, it was rebuilt into its current neo-Renaissance form. Today the castle is privately owned and open to the public.

The Church of Saint Wenceslaus was built in the late Baroque style near the castle in 1767. In the 20th century, it fell into disrepair, but the ruin was completely reconstructed in 2003.

Gallery

References

External links

Villages in Mladá Boleslav District